Pluk de Nacht is an Open Air Film Festival based in Amsterdam. Every summer the Open Air Film Festival Amsterdam presents a selection of unreleased independent arthouse cinema, documentary, animation and shorts, attracting both film enthusiasts and professionals. Films are projected in the open air on a beautiful old harbour location in the centre of Amsterdam. Admission to all festival activities and screenings is free.
 
The Open Air Film Festival Amsterdam was founded in 2003 by a group of young film professionals. Dissatisfied by seeing wonderful works of cinematic art not being picked up by Dutch distributors and cinemas, they started a film festival aimed at finding new audiences for these films.

History

2003
The first edition of the festival started on Friday the 15th of August. During eight days the following films were screened:
A Cold Summer (Paul Middleditch)
Verboden te Zuchten (Alex Stockman)
Jesus' Son (Alison Maclean)
Plus-minus Null (Eoin Moore)
Durval Discos (Anna Muylaert)

2004
The second edition took place from 5 till the 29th of August 2004. The following films were screened:
Dandelion (Mark Milgard)
Aaltra (Benoît Delépine)
Cinemania (Angela Christlieb)
Time Code (Mike Figgis)
Four Shades of Brown (Tomas Alfredson)
Prey for Rock & Roll (Alex Steyermark)
Böse Zellen (Barbara Albert)
Struggle (Ruth Mader)
Lift (Marc Isaacs)

2005
The third edition of the festival started on 25 August 2005. During 11 days the following films were screened:
Waar is mijn jas? / nou, dat was het dan (Dick Rijneke)
Dead Man's Shoes (Shane Meadows)
Last life in the universe (Pen-ek Ratanaruang)
Ronda Nocturna (Edgardo Cozarinsky)
Fred (Wilbert Bank)
Die souvenirs des herrn X (Arash T. Riahi)
Midwinter's Night Dream (Goran Paskaljevic)

External links 
 

Film festivals in the Netherlands